Ralf Detlef Bode (March 31, 1941 – February 27, 2001) was a German-born American cinematographer best known for his work on Coal Miner's Daughter.

Biography

Born in Berlin, Germany, Bode moved with his family to Vermont in 1954, when he was 14 years old. A graduate of the University of Vermont, he initially started off as an actor and enrolled at Yale School of Drama. He also served as a photographer in the United States Army.

Bode did the cinematography for films such as Saturday Night Fever, Gorky Park, The Accused, Uncle Buck and Don Juan DeMarco. He was an uncredited second unit director for Rocky (1976), and is credited with shooting the scenes in which Sylvester Stallone runs up the steps of the Philadelphia Museum of Art. He received an Academy Award nomination for his cinematography on Coal Miner's Daughter. He was nominated for two Emmy Awards in the Outstanding Cinematography category: in 1994 for Gypsy and in 2000 for Annie.

Bode died on February 27, 2001, of lung cancer at age 59 in Santa Monica, California.

Filmography
 The Stoolie (1972) (with John G. Alvidsen and Charles Clifton)
 There Is No 13 (1974)
 Saturday Night at the Baths (1975)
 Fore Play (1975)
 SOS: Screw on the Screen (1975)
 The Force Beyond (1977)
 Saturday Night Fever (1977)
 Somebody Killed Her Husband (1978)
 Slow Dancing in the Big City (1978)
 Rich Kids (1979)
 Coal Miner's Daughter (1980)
 Dressed to Kill (1980)
 Raggedy Man (1981)
 A Little Sex (1982)
 Gorky Park (1983)
 Firstborn (1984)
 Bring on the Night (1985)
 The Whoopee Boys (1986)
 Violets Are Blue (1986)
 Critical Condition (1987)
 The Big Town (1987)
 Distant Thunder (1988)
 The Accused (1988)
 Cousins (1989)
 Uncle Buck (1989)
 One Good Cop (1991)
 Leaving Normal (1992)
 Love Field (1992)
 Made in America (1993)
 The Nutcracker (1993)
 Bad Girls (1994)
 Safe Passage (1994)
 Don Juan DeMarco (1995)
 The Big Green (1995)
 Women Without Implants (1997)
 A Simple Wish (1997)
 Hacks (1997)
 The Secret Life of Girls (1999)
 Boys and Girls (2000)
 Speaking of Sex (2001)

Television
 Sea Marks (1976) (TV movie)
 The Very Best of the Ed Sullivan Show (1991 TV special)
 The Very Best of the Ed Sullivan Show 2 (1991 TV special)
 Spic-O-Rama (1993 TV special)
 Gypsy (1993 TV movie)
 The History of Rock 'n' Roll (four episodes, 1995)
 A Streetcar Named Desire (1995 TV movie)
 Cinderella (1997 TV movie)
 Last Rites (1998 TV movie)
 The Hunt for the Unicorn Killer (1999 TV movie)
 The Wonderful World of Disney (1 episode, 1999)
 Sarah, Plain and Tall: Winter's End'' (1999 TV movie)

References

External links 
Ralf D. Bode at the Internet Movie Database.

1941 births
2001 deaths
American cinematographers
Deaths from lung cancer in California
Film people from Berlin
German emigrants to the United States
United States Army soldiers
University of Vermont alumni
Yale School of Drama alumni